Calibanus glassianus is a rare plant species known from the Mexican state of Guanajuato. It is an evergreen succulent with a swollen stem and red berries.  It is one of only two known species in the genus Calibanus.

References 

Plants described in 2003
Nolinoideae
Flora of Mexico
Flora of Guanajuato